The Principality of Serbia was an autonomous state in the Balkans that came into existence as a result of the Serbian Revolution, which lasted between 1804 and 1817. Its creation was negotiated first through an unwritten agreement between Miloš Obrenović, leader of the Second Serbian Uprising, and Ottoman official Marashli Pasha. It was followed by the series of legal documents published by the Sublime Porte in 1828, 1829 and finally, 1830—the Hatt-i Sharif. Its de facto independence ensued in 1867, following the evacuation of the remaining Ottoman troops from the Belgrade Fortress and the country; its independence was recognized internationally in 1878 by the Treaty of Berlin. In 1882 the country was elevated to the status of kingdom.

Background and establishment

The Serbian revolutionary leaders—first Karađorđe and then Miloš Obrenović—succeeded in their goal of liberating Serbia from centuries-long Turkish rule. Turkish authorities acknowledged the state by the 1830 Hatt-i Sharif, and Miloš Obrenović became a hereditary prince (knjaz) of the Serbian Principality. Serbia was de jure an autonomous province of the Ottoman Empire, its autonomy was constrained by the presence of the Turkish army on its soil and by being forced to pay to Istanbul a yearly tribute of 2.3 million groschen, which represented about 10% of the country's budget.

At first, the principality included only the territory of the former Pashaluk of Belgrade, but in 1831–33 it expanded to the east, south, and west. In 1866 Serbia began the campaign of forging The First Balkan Alliance by signing the series of agreements with other Balkan entities in the period 1866–68. On 18 April 1867 the Ottoman government ordered the Ottoman garrison, which since 1826 had been the last representation of Ottoman suzerainty in Serbia, withdrawn from the Belgrade fortress. The only stipulation was that the Ottoman flag continue to fly over the fortress alongside the Serbian one. Serbia's de facto independence dates from this event. A new constitution in 1869 defined Serbia as an independent state. Serbia was further expanded to the southeast in 1878, when its independence from the Ottoman Empire won full international recognition at the Treaty of Berlin. The Principality would last until 1882 when it was raised to the level of the Kingdom of Serbia.

Political history

Constitutions
1835 Sretenje Constitution, in effect 1835
1838 Constitution of Serbia, in effect 1838–69
1869 Constitution of Serbia, in effect 1869–88

Autonomy
Akkerman Convention (7 October 1826), treaty between the Russian Empire and Ottoman Empire, contained article 5 on Serbia: autonomy, and return of lands removed in 1813, Serbs were also granted freedom of movement through the Ottoman Empire. Rejected by Mahmud II in 1828.
1829 hatt-i sharif
1830 hatt-i sharif
1833 hatt-i sharif

Administrative divisions

The Principality had a total of sixty-six .

Military
The Armed Forces of the Principality of Serbia was the armed forces of the Principality of Serbia. Founded in 1830, it became a standing army to take part to the First and Second Serbo Turkish Wars of 1876-1878, the first conflict in the nation modern history, after which the country gained its full independence. It was succeeded by the Royal Serbian Army.

Demographics

In the first decades of the principality, the population was about 85% Serb and 15% non-Serb.  Of those, most were Vlachs, and there were some Muslim Albanians, which were the overwhelming majority of the Muslims that lived in Smederevo, Kladovo and Ćuprija. The new state aimed to homogenize of its population. As a result, from 1830 to the wars of the 1870s in which Albanians were expelled from the environs of Nis, it has been estimated that up to 150,000 Albanians that lived in the territories of the Principality of Serbia had been expelled.

Rulers
The Principality was ruled by the Obrenović dynasty, except for a period under Prince Aleksandar of the Karađorđević dynasty. Princes Miloš and Mihailo Obrenović each reigned twice.

See also
History of Serbia

References

Sources

Further reading

 
 Divac, Zorica. "Family and marital affairs in 19th century Serbia." Glasnik Etnografskog instituta SANU 54 (2006): 219–232.
 Frucht, Richard, ed. Encyclopedia of Eastern Europe: From the Congress of Vienna to the Fall of Communism (2000) online

Other languages
 
 
 
Катић, Бојана Миљковић. Пољопривреда Кнежевине Србије:(1834-1867): Agriculture of the Principality of Sebia (1834-1867). Vol. 65. Istorijski institut, 2014.
 
 Јагодић, Милош. Насељавање Кнежевине Србије: 1861-1880: Settlement of the Princedom of Serbia: 1861–1880. Vol. 47. Istorijski institut, 2004.
 Katić, Bojana Miljković. "Сеоско професионално занатство Кнежевине Србије (1834-1866)." Историјски часопис 62 (2013): 309–329.
 Stranjaković, Dragoslav. Politička propaganda Srbije u jugoslovenskim pokrajinama: 1844-1858 godine. Štamparija Drag. Gregorića, 1936.
 Stranjaković, Dragoslav. Jugoslovenski nacionalni i državni program Kneževine Srbije iz 1844 god. Srpska manastirska štamparija, 1931.
 Stranjaković, Dragoslav., 1932. Srbija pijemont južnih slovena, 1842–1853. Nar. štamparija.
 Petrović, V., and N. Petrović. "Građa za istoriju Kneževine Srbije, vreme prve vlade kneza Miloša Obrenovića." Beograd, knjiga prva 1821 (1815).
 Nikolić, Dragan K. Izvori i priroda krivičnog prava Kneževine Srbije u vreme pripreme krivičnog zakona. 1988.
 Arsić, M. "Crkvene matične knjige u propisima Kneževine Srbije." Arhivski pregled 1.4 (2000): 52–5.
 Leovac, Danko Lj. Србија и Русија за време друге владавине кнеза Михаила:(1860-1868). Diss. Универзитет у Београду, Филозофски факултет, 2014.
 
 Недељко, В. "AUTONOMY OF THE ORTHODOX CHURCH IN THE PRINCIPALITY OF SERBIA AND THE ARONDATION OF THE EPISCOPACIES (1831-1836)." Istraživanja: Journal of Historical Researches 25 (2016): 233–248.
 Popović, Radomir J. "Пројект Устава Србије Матије Бана из 1846. године." Мешовита грађа 34 (2013): 149–171.
 Ђорђевић, Тихомир. "Насељавање Србије, за време прве владе кнеза Милоша Обреновића (1815-1839)." Гласник Српског географског друштва 5 (1921): 116–139.
 Маринковић, Мирјана, and Терзић Славенко. Турска Канцеларија Кнеза Милоша Обреновића, 1815–1839. Историјски институт САНУ, 1999.
 Кандић, Љубица. "Делатност скупштина за време прве владе Милоша Обреновића." Анали Правног факултета у Београду 1 (1961).

External links

Principality of Serbia in 1833 
Principality of Serbia in 1878
Balkan Peninsula in 1878
Map
Map

 
1815 establishments in Europe
1882 disestablishments in Europe
Principality of Serbia
Former monarchies
Lists of princes
States and territories established in 1817
19th century in Serbia
Vassal states of the Ottoman Empire